Mancenans is a commune in the Doubs department in the Bourgogne-Franche-Comté region in eastern France.

Geography

Population

See also
 Communes of the Doubs department

References

External links

 Mancenans on the intercommunal Web site of the department 

Communes of Doubs